Shenzhen Overseas Chinese Town Company Limited known as OCT Limited (formerly OCT Holding) is a publicly traded company based in Shenzhen, China. It is a subsidiary of state-owned Overseas Chinese Town Enterprises (or OCT Group).

OCT Limited was incorporated in 1997.

OCT Limited was ranked 1,164th in 2016 Forbes Global 2000 List. OCT Limited is a constituent of SZSE 100 Index (blue chip index) and pan-China index CSI 300 Index.

Equity investments
 Window of the World (49%)
 Window of the World (Changsha) (25%)

Board of directors 

 Chairman: Duan Xiannian (also served in parent company Overseas Chinese Town Enterprises)
 President and executive director : Wang Xiaowen (also served in parent company Overseas Chinese Town Enterprises)
 Vice-president and executive director : Wang Jiuling (nominated by ultimate parent entity the SASAC of the State Council)
 Independent director: 
 Independent director: 
 Independent director: 
 Independent director:

References

External links
 

Real estate companies of China
Companies based in Shenzhen
Companies listed on the Shenzhen Stock Exchange
Companies in the CSI 100 Index